Lageia is a small village in the Larnaca District of Cyprus, 7 km west of Pano Lefkara. Its population in 2011 was 28.

References

Communities in Larnaca District